Stephen Hartley Dorff Jr. (born July 29, 1973) is an American actor. He is known for portraying Roland West in the third season of HBO's crime drama anthology series True Detective, PK in The Power of One, Stuart Sutcliffe in Backbeat, Johnny Marco in Sofia Coppola's Somewhere, Glen in The Gate, and for his roles in Cecil B. DeMented, The Motel Life, S.F.W., Space Truckers, and in Blade as vampire mastermind Deacon Frost.

Early life
Dorff was born in Atlanta, Georgia, the son of Nancy and Steve Dorff, who is a composer and music producer. His father is Jewish, and his mother was Catholic, and Dorff has stated that he was "brought up half-Jewish." Dorff's brother Andrew (1976–2016) was a country music songwriter. He was raised in Los Angeles, where his father worked, and began acting as a child, appearing in commercials for Kraft and Mattel. Dorff attended several private schools.

Career

Dorff started acting in the late 1980s, landing a few minor roles before being cast as the star of The Gate (1987), a horror film about a boy who, along with a friend, discovers a hole in his back yard that is a gateway to Hell. The film was a moderate box office success. He made guest appearances in television programs such as Diff'rent Strokes, Family Ties, Blossom, Roseanne, and Married... with Children. He appeared in the television movies In Love and War, I Know My First Name is Steven and What a Dummy. In 1990, he landed a leading role opposite Patty Duke in the TV movie Always Remember I Love You. In 1992, he starred in The Power of One opposite Sir John Gielgud, Morgan Freeman, and Daniel Craig. In 1993, director Marty Callner hired him to star alongside teen idol Alicia Silverstone in the music video Cryin' by American rock band Aerosmith. He had a leading role as the love interest of Reese Witherspoon's character in S.F.W. (1994).  In 1994, Dorff starred in the Iain Softley film Backbeat as the "fifth Beatle" Stuart Sutcliffe during the early days of the Beatles' existence as a group.  Dorff's performance was critically acclaimed, with Paul McCartney remarking that while he was disappointed with some aspects of the film, "I was quite taken, however, with Stephen Dorff's astonishing performance as Stu."

In 1996, he starred in the movie Space Truckers and as Candy Darling in I Shot Andy Warhol, a film about Valerie Solanas, the woman infamous for shooting pop-art icon Andy Warhol. He was one of the first actors to act in the first digitally downloadable movie, SightSound.com's Quantum Project, also starring John Cleese. He played the protagonist, XIII, of a live action TV series of the comic/video game of XIII. He is known for his part as the evil vampire Deacon Frost in the Marvel Comics superhero horror film, Blade (1998). In 1999 he starred opposite Susan Sarandon in Earthly Possessions. He played Dale Massie in the 2003 thriller Cold Creek Manor, alongside Dennis Quaid and Sharon Stone. In 2004, Dorff starred in the music video for "Everytime" by Britney Spears, playing Spears' boyfriend. He appeared in the 2009 films Public Enemies and Black Water Transit. 

In 2010, he starred in the drama Somewhere opposite Elle Fanning, directed by Sofia Coppola. He described what landing the role meant to him after the loss of his mother as "It almost felt like a savior, this movie, because I felt like it helped me ... I was real empty inside so this was an incredible thing that made me smile." 

Dorff appeared as porn star Dick Shadow in the sex industry comedy Bucky Larson: Born to Be a Star, a film produced by Adam Sandler, who also co-wrote the screenplay. Dorff has appeared in television and print advertisements for blu eCigs, an electronic cigarette company.  Dorff also starred in The Motel Life opposite Emile Hirsch, Dakota Fanning and Kris Kristofferson and in the crime drama film Officer Down. In 2013, he was a guest of honor on 6th Off Plus Camera  In 2017, he played obsessed Texas Ranger Hal Hartman in the Texas Chain Saw Massacre prequel Leatherface. Dorff starred as Detective Roland West in Season 3 of HBO's series True Detective.

Filmography

Film

Television

Music videos

Video game

References

External links

1973 births
Living people
20th-century American male actors
21st-century American male actors
American male child actors
American male film actors
American male television actors
American people of Jewish descent
Male actors from Atlanta
Male actors from Los Angeles